The 1986 NCAA Division I Men's Soccer Tournament was the 27th organized men's college soccer tournament by the National Collegiate Athletic Association, to determine the top college soccer team in the United States. The Duke Blue Devils won their first national title by defeating the Akron Zips in the championship game, 1–0. The final match was played on December 13, 1986, in Tacoma, Washington, at the Tacoma Dome.

Early rounds

Final

See also  
 NCAA Division II Men's Soccer Championship
 NCAA Division III Men's Soccer Championship
 NAIA Men's Soccer Championship

References 

NCAA Division I Men's Soccer Tournament seasons
NCAA Dicison I Men's
NCAA Division I Men's Soccer Tournament
NCAA Division I Men's Soccer Tournament